George Elmer Browne (1871–1946) was an American artist known in France and Massachusetts.

Biography
Browne was born in Gloucester, Massachusetts. He studied in Boston at the Cowles Art School and the Museum of Fine Arts before completing his education under Jules Lefebvre and Tony Robert-Fleury in Paris. He founded the West End School of Art at his summer home in Provincetown in 1916 at the tip of Cape Cod far away from his studio in New York. The group was influenced by the impressionists and was among five schools in the town. Browne was very well regarded in France and became a Chevalier of the Legion of Honor. Browne has work in Provincetown Museum. In 1919, Browne was elected into the National Academy of Design as an Associate member, and became a full member in 1928.

Daisy Marguerite Hughes was among Browne's pupils.

Browne died in Provincetown.

References

External links
 
George Elmer Browne exhibition catalogs

1871 births
1946 deaths
19th-century American painters
20th-century American painters
American male painters
Chevaliers of the Légion d'honneur
Orientalist painters
Painters from Massachusetts
People from Gloucester, Massachusetts
National Academy of Design members
19th-century American male artists
20th-century American male artists
Members of the American Academy of Arts and Letters